Giovanni Battista Balbis (17 November 1765 – 3 February 1831) was an Italian botanist and politician who worked in Italy and France. He alternately was called Gioanni Battista Balbis and Jean-Baptiste Balbis.

In 1804, botanist Antonio José Cavanilles, published Balbisia, which is a genus of flowering plants from southern South America, belonging to the family Francoaceae and was named in Giovanni Battista Balbis's honour.

References

1765 births
1831 deaths
18th-century Italian botanists
19th-century Italian botanists
Italian politicians